ABC with Kenny G is a Canadian animated television series developed and produced at Big Bad Boo Studios in Vancouver. The musical ABC series is a spin-off from 16 Hudson. The series is about Kensington, Lili's cat from 16 Hudson, who dresses up as a singer and goes down to the Milk & Cookies Jazz club at night, when the humans are sleeping, to teach his animal friends the ABCs. Marcus Mosley is the main performer in the role of Kensington. He is a gospel singer based in Vancouver.

ABC with Kenny G is created and directed by Shabnam Rezaei and airs on TVOKids, Ici Radio-Canada Télé, Knowledge Kids and TFO.

References

External links
ABC with Kenny G Official TVOKids website
ABC with Kenny G Official Knowledge Kids website

2010s Canadian animated television series
2010s preschool education television series
2018 Canadian television series debuts
TVO original programming
Canadian animated television spin-offs
Canadian children's animated musical television series
Canadian preschool education television series
Animated preschool education television series
Animated television series about cats